Freattyda is the name of a residential area in Piraeus, Athens,  Greece. It is situated in the southeastern part of the Piraeus, near the Zea harbour. The Hellenic Maritime Museum is situated in Freattyda. 

Populated places in Piraeus (regional unit)